Kate Walsh O'Beirne (September 23, 1949 – April 23, 2017) was the President of National Review Institute. She was the Washington editor of National Review. Her column, "Bread and Circuses," covered Congress, politics, and U.S. domestic policy.

O'Beirne was a regular contributor on CNN's Saturday night political round-table program, Capital Gang, along with Al Hunt, Mark Shields, Robert Novak, and Margaret Carlson. O'Beirne and Novak typically argued the conservative viewpoint, while Hunt, Shields, and Carlson provided the liberal viewpoint. She also served as a substitute host on CNN's Crossfire, as well as a commentator for the NewsHour with Jim Lehrer. She was lastly a political analyst for MSNBC's Hardball.

Early life 
On September 23, 1949, O'Beirne was born Kate Monica Walsh in Brooklyn, New York City, New York. She grew up in Manhasset, New York. She was raised in a traditional Irish Catholic family.

After graduating from St. Mary's High School in 1967, she attended Good Counsel College, a Catholic women's school in White Plains, New York, majoring in English and journalism.

Early career 
While at Good Counsel College, O'Beirne took a leave of absence to work on the successful 1970 U.S. Senate campaign of Conservative Party of New York State member James Buckley. She returned to his office as an aide after graduation.

In 1976, she graduated from St. John's University School of Law, and in the same year married James O'Beirne, an infantry officer in the United States Army (now White House liaison to the Pentagon). For the next ten years, she traveled with him and raised their two sons.

Career 
In 1986, the family moved to Washington, D.C., and she served as deputy assistant secretary for legislation at the United States Department of Health and Human Services until 1988. She moved on to become deputy director of domestic-policy studies at The Heritage Foundation, where she supervised studies in the area of health care, welfare, education, and housing.

At the Heritage Foundation, O'Beirne was the vice president of government relations. She was responsible for keeping Washington policymakers abreast of Heritage proposals and research findings in all areas of the Foundation's study, while serving as a contributing editor for National Review.

In 1992, President of the United States George H. W. Bush named her to the Presidential Commission on Women in the Armed Forces.

In 1995, she began work as part-time contributing editor for National Review, but was soon appointed Washington editor. Her work on the magazine led to her invitation to join Capital Gang, and from there her other work in television.

She received an honorary degree from St. John's University in 1997.

O'Beirne was the President of National Review Institute, a nonprofit public policy organization.

Personal 
O'Beirne was married to Army Lt. Col. James O'Beirne. O'Beirne had two sons, Philip O'Beirne and John O'Beirne.  In 2016, O'Beirne was diagnosed with lung cancer. On April 23, 2017, she died at Georgetown University Hospital in Washington, D.C.

Writings
 Women Who Make the World Worse: and How Their Radical Feminist Assault Is Ruining Our Schools, Families, Military, and Sports, Sentinel HC, 2005.

References

External links
 Kate O'Beirne's National Review profile.
 Column archive, National Review
 Profile: "Living By Words Alone," St. John's Alumni Magazine, Fall/Winter 2002, Vol. 5, No. 1, pp. 4–8. Full issue of this publication available (.pdf) via this link
 
 
 Obituary, Murphy Falls Church Funeral Home, Falls Church, Virginia

1949 births
2017 deaths
American columnists
American newspaper editors
American political commentators
American television personalities
American women television personalities
The Heritage Foundation
American people of Irish descent
People from Manhasset, New York
National Review people
American women columnists
Women newspaper editors
20th-century American women writers
20th-century American writers
Female critics of feminism
21st-century American women writers
20th-century American journalists
21st-century American journalists
Journalists from New York (state)